The 1987–88 season was the 60th season played by Newport County in the Football League and the first season played back in the Fourth Division since relegation from the Third Division at the end of the 1986–87 season. The club suffered a second successive relegation and were only the second team to be automatically relegated to the Football Conference.

Newport's first Division Four campaign in seven years rapidly turned into an absolute nightmare, against the backdrop of an increasingly desperate financial situation. John Lewis was sacked with the season barely a month old after a return of just one point from County's first five games, and Brian Eastick was called in to take over. Eastick won his first match in charge, but took a month to get another win. Victories over Welsh rivals Swansea City and Wrexham proved to be the sole highlight of this campaign, but were followed by a three-month run without victory, the third successive season Newport suffered such an indignity. January 1988 saw a minor improvement in form, but the already poor campaign totally fell apart afterwards, and Newport earned no wins and just three points in the next four months. Eastick was sacked during this dreadful run, and coach David Williams took charge for the remainder of the season in a fruitless attempt to avoid relegation.

Season review

Results summary

Results by round

Fixtures and results

Fourth Division

FA Cup

Football League Cup

Football League Trophy

Welsh Cup

League table

P = Matches played; W = Matches won; D = Matches drawn; L = Matches lost; F = Goals for; A = Goals against; GD = Goal difference; Pts = Points

External links
 Newport County 1987-1988 : Results
 Newport County football club match record: 1988
 WELSH CUP 1987/88

1987-88
Newport County
Newport County